Stanley Harding Dye (March 12, 1908 – July 3, 2003) was a politician in Ontario, Canada. He was Progressive Conservative member from 1945 to 1948 who represented the riding of Brantford.

Background
Dye was born in London, England, he is the son of Charles Harding Dye, was educated there and came to Canada in 1928. In 1944, he married Selina Kingswood. He served overseas during World War II and was wounded at Dieppe. Dye was manager for the Brantford Chiefs of the OHA.

Politics
He ran as the Progressive Conservative candidate in the 1945 provincial election. He defeated Liberal candidate Donald Williamson by a slim margin of 27 votes. Williamson contemplated but eventually declined to request a recount. He served as a backbench supporter in the government of George Drew.

In 1948, the PC nomination in the riding was contested and Dye lost to C.C. Slemin. Instead Dye put his name forward as an independent Conservative candidate but finished 4th in the polling. Slemin lost to Liberal George Gordon.

Later life
In 1960 he was appointed as a bailiff. It was alleged that he received the appointment for his past service as PC MPP. He died in Brantford in 2003.

References

External links 

1908 births
2003 deaths
Progressive Conservative Party of Ontario MPPs